Sítio do Pica-pau Amarelo is a 1952 Brazilian children-family television series produced and aired by Rede Tupi, Sítio was scripted by Brazilian author Tatiana Belinky, based on the series of novels of same name. The series is the second live-action adaptation of the Sítio universe, after the feature film O Saci, released in the previous year. It was the first television adaptation of the homonymous work by Monteiro Lobato.

Sítio tells the story of the peaceful title site, the Yellow Woodpecker Ranch, where its unique dwellers live in fantasy and learning. It starred actress Lúcia Lambertini (occasionally replaced by Dulce Margarida) in the role of Emília, the living, smart and talkative doll of the farm. The Viscount of Sabugosa was played by Rúbens Mollino, and Later In 1958 Mollino was replaced by Luciano Maurício. The series premiered on 3 June 1952 and ran until 6 March 1963, being canceled after 360 episodes and several recastings. The cast needed to re-enact some episodes in 1963 for the show's "reruns", since episodes were originally broadcast live. Each episode was of 30 minutes duration.

Plot
At the peaceful Yellow Woodpecker ranch, an intelligent and tender old lady named Mrs. Benta lives with her grandsons Lúcia "Little Nose" and Pedrinho. The two kids have their respective living and thinking toys: the talkative rag doll, and the Viscount of Sabugosa, an incredibly intellectual man made of maize. Aunt Nastácia prepares her unique delicacies for the family, all of them living in magic, fantasy and discovery.

Cast
Sydnéia Rossi as Dona Benta (1952–1953)
Suzy Arruda as Dona Benta (1954–1957)
Leonor Lambertini as Dona Benta (1958–1963)
Zeni Pereira as Tia Nastácia
Lúcia Lambertini as Emília
Lidia Rosemberg as Narizinho (1952–1953)
Edy Cerri as Narizinho (1954–1963)
Sérgio Rosemberg as Pedrinho (1952)
Julinho Simões as Pedrinho (1953–1954)
David José as Pedrinho (1955–1963)
Rúbens Mollino as Visconde de Sabugosa (1952–1957)
Luciano Maurício as Visconde de Sabugosa (1958–1963)
Júlio Silva as Rabicó (1952-1957)
Ricardo Gouveia as Rabicó (1958-1963)
Paulo Basco as Dr. Caramujo

Rio de Janeiro version 
Between 1955 and 1956, as the original program was broadcast only in São Paulo, TV Tupi produced a version at its headquarters in Rio de Janeiro with a different cast. Only Lúcia Lambertini remained in the same role, traveling weekly to appear in both versions.
Iná Malagutti as Dona Benta (1955)
Wanda Hammel as Dona Benta (1956)
Benedita Rodrigues as Tia Nastácia
Lúcia Lambertini as Emília
Leny Vieira as Narizinho
André José Adler as Pedrinho
Elísio de Albuquerque as Visconde de Sabugosa (1955)
Hernê Lebon as Rabicó (1955); Visconde de Sabugosa (1956)
Daniel Filho as Dr. Caramujo

Production
The idea was first conceived by Tatiana Belinki's husband, psychiatrist Júlio Gouveia, after he asked some adults, at a children's birthday party, to improvise a stage play version of Peter Pan for their present and bored kids. This led him to write a thesis about children's theatre and its role on the youngers' education. His article impressed TV Tupi, the only television network in Brazil at that time. He was then hired by the channel and decided to adapt Monteiro Lobato's fantasy series of novels for the teleplay, and the pilot was broadcast live as a single presentation. The good rating forced Tupi to create a television series, with Júlio Gouveia's wife Tatiana Belinky as the screenwriter. Despite Sítio immediate repercussion, the budget was extremely limited and only one set (the site's gazebo) was available. Other sets required by the script would be hastily handmade by the crew. Since special effects were non-existent, the fantasy was highly improvised with available resources. For example, for the underwater scenes at the Clear Waters Kingdom, Tatiana Belinky put her own fish bowl in front of the camera. Salathiel Coelho's song "Dobrado" was the series' opening theme before Gilberto Gil composed the famous Sítio do Picapau Amarelo main title theme for Rede Globo's posterior versions.

The series was shown on Thursdays at 7:30 pm live, as there were no recording techniques yet for television. The scenes took place mostly in a single fixed setting, the balcony of the farm, since television in Brazil had only existed for a year and resources at the time were still precarious and simple. Scenes in different locations, such as in the woods or in the kitchen, were set up on specific days and the characters moved there abruptly. The stories had no interruption for the commercial break and, therefore, during the dialogues or scenes with the fixed actors, product announcements were introduced. The episodes began with images of Júlio Gouveia opening a book to tell a story. In the end, the episode ended with Júlio closing the Book. In 1963, with the creation of the videotape and the possibility of recording in advance, several old episodes were re-recorded.

Soundtrack

The LP of the soundtrack and the double compact of the series of the Sítio do Pica-pau Amarelo, released in 1952 by Odeon Records.

Tracks 
 A Pílula Falante
 O Casamento da Emília

Notes and references

External links

Brazilian children's television series
Sítio do Picapau Amarelo